The Producers is a musical comedy with music and lyrics by Mel Brooks, and a book by Brooks and Thomas Meehan. It is adapted from Brooks's 1967 film of the same name. 

The story concerns two theatrical producers who scheme to get rich by fraudulently overselling interests in a Broadway flop. Complications arise when the show unexpectedly turns out to be successful. The humor of the show draws on ridiculous accents, caricatures of gay people and Nazis, and many show business in-jokes.

After 33 previews, the original Broadway production opened at the St. James Theatre on April 19, 2001, starring Nathan Lane and Matthew Broderick, and ran for 2,502 performances, winning a record-breaking 12 Tony Awards. It spawned a successful West End production running for just over two years, national tours in the US and UK, many productions worldwide and a 2005 film version.

Background
David Geffen persuaded Mel Brooks to turn his film into a stage musical. When Brooks met with Jerry Herman to discuss their working together, Herman declined, telling Brooks that he should do the job himself, as he was a good songwriter. Brooks then asked Thomas Meehan to join him in writing the book for the stage. Brooks persuaded Mike Ockrent and his wife Susan Stroman to join the creative team as director and choreographer. After Ockrent's death in 1999, Stroman agreed to continue as both director and choreographer.

Plot

Act I
In New York in 1959, theatre producer Max Bialystock opens Funny Boy, a musical version of Hamlet ("Opening Night"). Reviews are overwhelmingly negative, and the show closes after one performance. Max, who was once called the King of Broadway, tells a crowd of down-and-outs of his past achievements and vows to return to form ("King of Broadway").

The next day, Leo Bloom, a mousy accountant, comes to Max's office to audit his books. When one of Max's little old lady "investors" arrives, Max tells Leo to wait in the bathroom until she leaves. She plays a sex game with Max, who eventually persuades her to give him a check to be invested in his next play, to be called "Cash". Leo reveals his lifelong dream to be a Broadway producer. After recovering from a panic attack caused by Max touching his blue blanket, Leo tells Max that he has found an accounting error in his books: Max raised $100,000 for Funny Boy, but the play only cost $98,000. Max begs Leo to cook the books to hide the discrepancy; Leo reluctantly agrees. After some calculations, he realizes that "under the right circumstances, a producer could make more money with a flop than he could with a hit". Inspired, Max proposes a scheme to find the worst musical ever written, hire the worst director and actors in New York, raise two million dollars of investment from "old ladies", produce the work on Broadway, close it as a huge failure, and escape to Rio with the money. However, Leo refuses to help Max with his scheme ("We Can Do It"). 

When he arrives at work six minutes late, Leo's horrid boss, Mr. Marks, reminds him that he is a nobody. While he and his miserable co-workers toil over accounts, Leo daydreams of becoming a Broadway producer ("I Wanna Be a Producer"). He realizes that his job is terrible, quits, and returns to Max ("We Can Do It" (reprise)). The next day, they search for the worst play ever written, and Max discovers a sure-fire flop that would offend people of all races, creeds and religions: Springtime for Hitler: A Gay Romp with Adolf and Eva at Berchtesgaden, written by ex-Nazi Franz Liebkind, which Max describes as "a love letter to Hitler". They go to the playwright's home in Greenwich Village to get the rights to the play, where Franz is on the roof of his tenement with his pigeons reminiscing about the grand old days ("In Old Bavaria"). The producers get him to sign their contract by joining him in singing Adolf Hitler's favorite tune ("Der Guten Tag Hop Clop") and reciting the Siegfried Oath, under penalty of death, promising never to dishonor "the spirit and the memory of Adolf Elizabeth Hitler".

Next, they go to the townhouse of the flamboyantly gay Roger De Bris, the worst director in New York. At first, Roger and his "common law-assistant" Carmen Ghia decline the offer to direct because of the serious subject matter. After much persuading and invoking the possibility of a Tony Award, Roger relents and tells them that the second act must be rewritten so the Germans win World War II ("Keep It Gay"). Max and Leo return to the office to meet a Swedish bombshell named Ulla Inga Hansen Benson Yansen Tallen Hallen Svaden Swanson, who wants to audition for their next play ("When You've Got It, Flaunt It"). The producers are impressed, mostly by her sex-appeal, and hire her to be their "secretary-slash-receptionist". Max leaves to raise two million dollars to produce Springtime for Hitler by calling on all the little old ladies of New York ("Along Came Bialy"), and succeeds at raising the money ("Act I Finale").

Act II
Leo and Ulla are left alone in Max's office ('redecorated' by Ulla), and they start to fall in love ("That Face"). Max walks in and sees the tempting form of Ulla's covered behind ("That Face" (reprise)).

At the auditions for the title role, Hitler, one terrible actor after another is rejected by Roger in summary fashion. Finally, a frustrated Franz performs his own jazzy rendition of "Haben Sie Gehört Das Deutsche Band?", at the end of which Max approves Franz's audition. Opening night arrives, and after Leo curses the production by wishing everyone "good luck" ("You Never Say 'Good Luck' on Opening Night"), Franz literally breaks his leg falling down the stairs. Roger is the only one who knows the part of Hitler, and he rushes to the dressing room to get ready. The curtain rises, and Max and Leo watch the theatrical disaster unfold ("Springtime for Hitler"). Unfortunately, Roger's performance is so campy and outrageous that the audience mistakes it for satire, and the show becomes a surprise smash. 

Back at the office, Max and Leo are horrified as they read positive critical reviews for Springtime ("Where Did We Go Right?"). Roger and Carmen come to congratulate them, only to find them fighting over the accounting books. Franz bursts in, waving a pistol, outraged by Roger's portrayal of his beloved Führer; fearful for his life, Max finally admits to Leo, "We're in too deep." Max suggests that Franz shoot the actors (not the producers) as a way to close the show. The police are summoned by the commotion and arrest Franz, who breaks his other leg while trying to escape. They also arrest Max and take the books. As Leo hides, Ulla finds him and persuades him to take the two million dollars and run off to Rio with her.

In jail awaiting trial, Max receives a postcard from Leo (who is now in Rio with Ulla) and, feeling betrayed, recounts the whole show ("Betrayed"). At his trial, Max is found "incredibly guilty", but the now-married Leo and Ulla arrive in the nick of time. Leo turns in the stolen money and tells the judge that Max is a good man who has never hurt anyone despite his swindling, and the only man he has ever called a friend ("'Til Him"). Touched by their friendship, the judge decides not to separate the partners, sending them both (plus Franz) to Sing Sing prison for five years. In prison, they write a new musical entitled "Prisoners of Love", and they are pardoned by the governor for "having, through song and dance, brought joy and laughter into the hearts of every murderer, rapist, and sex maniac in Sing Sing." Soon after taking Prisoners of Love to Broadway (starring Roger and Ulla), Leo and Max become the kings of Broadway and walk off into the sunset ("Leo & Max"). Everyone comes back for one last song, telling the audience that it's time for them to leave ("Goodbye").

Musical numbers

Act I
 Overture – Orchestra
 "Opening Night" – Usherettes and Company
 "The King of Broadway" – Max and Company
 "We Can Do It" – Max and Leo
 "I Wanna Be a Producer" – Leo, Showgirls and Accountants
 "We Can Do It" (reprise) – Leo and Max
 "In Old Bavaria" – Franz
 "Der Guten Tag Hop-Clop" – Franz, Leo and Max
 "Keep It Gay" – Roger, Carmen, Max, Leo, Brian, Kevin, Scott, Shirley
 "When You Got It, Flaunt It" – Ulla
 "Along Came Bialy" – Max and Company
 "Act I Finale" – Max, Leo, Ulla, Franz, Roger, Carmen, Brian, Kevin, Scott, Shirley, and Company

Act II
 "That Face" – Leo, Ulla and Max
 "Haben Sie Gehört Das Deutsche Band?" – Franz and Max
 "Opening Night" (reprise) – Usherettes
 "You Never Say 'Good Luck' on Opening Night" – Roger, Carmen, Franz, Leo and Max
 "Springtime for Hitler" – Lead Tenor Stormtrooper, Ulla, Roger and Company
 "Where Did We Go Right?" – Leo and Max
 "Betrayed" – Max
 "'Til Him" – Leo, Max and Little Old Ladies
 "Prisoners of Love" – Convicts
 "Prisoners of Love" (reprise) – Roger, Ulla and Company
 "Leo and Max" – Max and Leo
 "Goodbye!" – Company

Notable casts

Notable Broadway replacements 
 Max: Fred Applegate, Tony Danza, John Treacy Egan, Henry Goodman, Richard Kind, Brad Oscar, Lewis J. Stadlen
 Leo: Roger Bart, Hunter Foster, Alan Ruck, Don Stephenson, Steven Weber
Ulla: Sarah Cornell, Angie Schworer
 Roger: Jonathan Freeman, Lee Roy Reams
Carmen: Brooks Ashmanskas, Jai Rodriguez
Franz: John Treacy Egan, Bill Nolte

Productions

Chicago tryout and Broadway (2001–2007) 

The Producers had a pre-Broadway tryout at Chicago's Cadillac Palace from February 1 to 25, 2001, starring Nathan Lane as Max Bialystock and Matthew Broderick as Leo Bloom.

The production opened on Broadway with the same cast at the St. James Theatre on April 19, 2001. It ran for 2,502 performances, closing on April 22, 2007.  The director and choreographer was Susan Stroman. Glen Kelly was the musical arranger and supervisor. The production won 12 Tony Awards, breaking the record held for 37 years by Hello, Dolly! which had won 10.

After the opening, The Producers broke the record for the largest single day box-office ticket sales in theatre history, taking in more than $3 million. The loss of the original stars later in the run had a detrimental effect on the success of the production, prompting the return of Lane and Broderick for a limited run from December 2003 to April 2004. The show's sales then broke its own record with over $3.5 million in single day ticket sales.

US Tours (2002–2005)
From September 2002 to July 2005, there were two touring companies that played 74 cities across the United States, grossing over $214 million. The first touring company starred Lewis J. Stadlen and Don Stephenson. They were replaced during the Los Angeles engagement in 2003 by Jason Alexander and Martin Short for the duration of the show's run in that city, as well as in San Francisco. Michael Kostroff, who had several supporting roles in that production and understudied Max, published a 2005 memoir of his touring experience, Letters from Backstage.

A second national tour opened in mid-2003 at the Colonial Theatre in Boston starring Brad Oscar (the original Broadway Franz Liebkind) as Max and Andy Taylor as Leo. The cast also featured Lee Roy Reams as Roger and Bill Nolte as Franz. This company toured the US for two years before playing in Tokyo, Japan.

West End (2004–2007)

The Producers opened in London's West End at the Theatre Royal, Drury Lane, on November 9, 2004 and closed on January 6, 2007, after 920 performances. The production starred Nathan Lane, reprising the role of Max after Richard Dreyfuss was "let go" by the producers after finding that he was unable "to fulfil the rigours of the role", with four days to go before first previews. Lee Evans played Leo (Lane and Evans had worked together in the 1997 movie MouseHunt), with Leigh Zimmerman as Ulla, Nicolas Colicos as Franz Liebkind, Conleth Hill as Roger De Bris, and James Dreyfus as Carmen Ghia.

The show enjoyed excellent box office success as it had in New York.  Despite the departure of Lane from the show, it continued to enjoy strong sales.  Max Bialystock was then played by Brad Oscar, Fred Applegate, and Cory English. Leo Bloom was later played by John Gordon Sinclair and Reece Shearsmith.

UK tour (2007–2008)
A United Kingdom tour opened in Manchester on February 19, 2007, where it played for three months before moving on. English and Sinclair reprised their roles of Max and Leo, respectively, and Peter Kay was cast in the role of Roger. For the majority of the tour, which ran until early 2008, Joe Pasquale took over the role of Leo and Russ Abbot played Roger.

Subsequent productions
A Los Angeles, California, production opened ran from May 2003 to January 2004 at the Pantages Theatre.  Co-starring were Jason Alexander as Max Bialystock and Martin Short as Leo Bloom.  The Las Vegas, Nevada production ran for a year in 2007 to 2008 at the Paris Hotel & Casino. It starred Brad Oscar as Bialystock, Larry Raben as Bloom and Leigh Zimmerman as Ulla, with David Hasselhoff receiving top billing as Roger De Bris. Once Hasselhoff left the production, top-billing went to Tony Danza, who stepped in as Bialystock.  The production was a 90-minute version. In 2007, the first U.S. regional theater production played in Lincolnshire, Illinois at the Marriott Theatre from September to November 2007 and starred Ross Lehman as Bialystock and Guy Adkins as Bloom.

In 2009, the show played at the Walnut Street Theatre in Philadelphia, Pennsylvania and at the Diablo Light Opera Company in California, starring Ginny Wehrmeister as Ulla, Ryan Drummond as Leo, and Marcus Klinger as Max. This production received the 2009 Shellie Award for Best Production. Oscar and Roger Bart reprised their roles as Max Bialystock and Leo Bloom, respectively, in a production at Starlight Theatre in Kansas City, Missouri in August 2010.

A production at the Hollywood Bowl, with Kind, Bart, and Beach reprising their roles as Max, Carmen Ghia and Roger DeBris from the original Broadway production, ran July 27–29, 2012. The cast also starred Jesse Tyler Ferguson as Leo and featured Dane Cook as Franz and Rebecca Romijn as Ulla.

A UK and Ireland tour began at the Churchill Theatre in Bromley on March 6, 2015, starring Cory English as Max, Jason Manford as Leo, Phill Jupitus (until May 16) and Ross Noble (from May 18 onwards) as Franz Liebkind, David Bedella as Roger De Bris and Louie Spence as Carmen Ghia (until May 2). The tour continued until July 2015 in Dublin.

The Producers has been presented professionally in many cities around the world, including Toronto, Berlin, Breda, Melbourne, Brisbane, Cairns, Sydney, Christchurch, Tel Aviv, Seoul, Buenos Aires, Tokyo, Osaka, Nagoya, Copenhagen, Milan, Budapest, Madrid, Halifax, Manchester, Mexico City, Prague, Stockholm, Panama, Bratislava, Vienna, Helsinki, Athens, Rio de Janeiro, São Paulo, Caracas, Lisbon, Gothenburg, Oslo, Oradea, Paris, Varde, Moscow, Ghent, Manila, and Belgrade.

Adaptations

In 2005, the musical was adapted into a musical film. It was directed by Stroman and starred most of the original Broadway cast, except for Brad Oscar – who was unable to reprise the role of Franz because he had signed on to play Max on Broadway and, instead, had a brief cameo as the cab driver – and Cady Huffman. Their roles were played by Will Ferrell and Uma Thurman, respectively. The songs "King of Broadway", "In Old Bavaria", and "Where Did We Go Right?" were not in the theatrical cut of the movie; "King of Broadway" and "In Old Bavaria" appear on the DVD as deleted scenes.  It opened on December 16, 2005, and received mixed reviews.

Popular culture
On the television show Curb Your Enthusiasm, The Producers was featured in almost every episode of Season 4. Mel Brooks offers Larry David the part of Max, with Ben Stiller as Leo. When David and Stiller have a falling out, Stiller is replaced by David Schwimmer. When David forgets his lines, his ad-libs keep the audience laughing. It is revealed that Brooks cast David, believing he would fail, to end the show and "free" Brooks of its success. Brooks and his real-life wife, Anne Bancroft, laugh at how bad David is, but to their dismay David ends up being a hit.

Awards and nominations
At the 2001 Tony Awards, The Producers won 12 out of its 15 nominations, setting the record for most wins in history and becoming one of the few musicals to win in every category for which it was nominated – it received two nominations for leading actor and three for featured actor. Its record for most nominations was tied in 2009 by Billy Elliot the Musical and broken in 2016 when Hamilton received 16 nominations, but its record number of wins still stands, as of 2022. Hamilton is second, with 11 wins.

Original Broadway production

Original London production

References

External links

 The Producers at the Music Theatre International website
Curtain Up reviews and information of various productions
PBS Great Performances "Recording the Producers"
Official site for the London production
Roger Bart and Brad Oscar – Downstage Center interview at American Theatre Wing.org

2001 musicals
Cultural depictions of Adolf Hitler
American plays adapted into films
Broadway musicals
West End musicals
Musicals based on films
Laurence Olivier Award-winning musicals
LGBT-related musicals
Plays set in New York City
Plays set in the 1950s
Musicals by Mel Brooks
Musicals by Thomas Meehan (writer)
Tony Award for Best Musical
Adaptations of works by Mel Brooks
Tony Award-winning musicals
Plays about Jews and Judaism
Backstage musicals
Fraud in fiction